Lockvattnet is a lake in Södermanland, Sweden.  Elghammar Castle lies on the lake's shore.

Lakes of Södermanland County